Adzopé is a town in south-eastern Ivory Coast. It is a sub-prefecture of and the seat of Adzopé Department. It is also a commune and the seat of La Mé Region in Lagunes District. In the 2021 census, the sub-prefecture of Adzopé had a population of 156,488.

Notable people 
Hervé Guy, French-Ivorian footballer
Igor Lolo, Ivorian footballer

References

Sub-prefectures of La Mé
Communes of La Mé
Regional capitals of Ivory Coast